Events from the year 1746 in France

Incumbents
 Monarch – Louis XV

Events
May 9 – Voltaire, on being admitted into the Académie française, gives a discours de réception in which he criticizes Boileau's poetry
June 16 – Battle of Piacenza: Austrian forces defeat the French and Spanish (War of the Austrian Succession)
August 12 – Battle of Rottofreddo: French forces repel an Austrial attack before withdrawing (War of the Austrian Succession)
October 11 – Battle of Rocoux: French forces defeat the allied Austrian, British, Hanoverian and Dutch (War of the Austrian Succession)
Jean-Étienne Guettard presents the first mineralogical map of France to the Académie des sciences
DMC (Dollfus-Mieg & Cie.) established as a textile spinning company in Mulhouse by Jean-Henri Dollfus

Births
 
January – Stéphanie Félicité, comtesse de Genlis, writer, harpist and educator (died 1830)
March 7 – André Michaux, botanist (died 1802)
March 30 – Francisco Goya, Spanish-born painter (died 1828)
May 5 – Jean-Nicolas Pache, politician (died 1823)
May 9 – Gaspard Monge, mathematician and geometer (died 1818)
July 30 – Louise du Pierry, astronomer (died 1807)
November 12 – Jacques Charles, physician (died 1823)
Victor d'Hupay, philosopher and writer (died 1818)

Deaths
February 22 – Guillaume Coustou the Elder, sculptor and academician (born 1677)
March 20 – Nicolas de Largillière, painter (born 1656)
July 3 – Joseph-François Lafitau, Jesuit missionary and naturalist (born 1681)
August 11 – Nicolas-Hubert de Mongault, ecclesiastic and writer (born 1674)
Jacques Bonne-Gigault de Bellefonds, archbishop (born 1698)
Michel Fourmont, antiquarian, scholar and forger (born 1690)
Joseph d'Abbadie de Saint-Castin, military officer in Acadia (born c. 1690?)

See also

References

1740s in France